A Dangerous Game may refer to:
 A Dangerous Game (novel), a 1956 novel by Swiss writer Friedrich Dürrenmatt
 A Dangerous Game (1922 film), an American silent drama film
 A Dangerous Game (1924 film), a German silent adventure film
 A Dangerous Game (1941 film), an American mystery film
 A Dangerous Game (2014 film), a documentary film
 A Dangerous Game (Pretty Little Liars), an episode of Pretty Little Liars

See also 
 Dangerous Game (disambiguation)